This list of tourist attractions in Denmark presents the 50 most visited tourist attractions in Denmark according to the annual survey published by VisitDenmark, the Danish national tourist organisation.  Visitor numbers are from 2013.

Scope
Not every attraction qualify for the survey and there are strict guidelines. Only commercial attractions aimed primarily at tourists and with a somewhat restricted access will be considered. Attractions not covered are for instance:
 Concert halls such as Copenhagen Concert Hall and Copenhagen Opera House
 Theatres such as the Royal Danish Theatre and the Royal Danish Playhouse
 Exhibition centres such as Bella Centre
 Natural sites. This includes places like Møns Klint, Grenen at Skagen Odde, Jægersborg Dyrehave and the four national parks.
 Freely accessible attractions such as Freetown Christiania and The Little Mermaid, both in Copenhagen.

Top 50 most visited attractions in Denmark

See also
 Tourism in Denmark
 List of museums in Denmark

References

Tourism in Denmark
List